Daniel Špaček (born January 9, 1986) is a Czech professional ice hockey player who currently plays with HC Bílí Tygři Liberec in the Czech Extraliga. Špaček previously played with HK Nitra in the Slovak Extraliga, and also in the Czech lower leagues with KLH Jindřichův Hradec, HC Vrchlabí, and HC Benátky nad Jizerou.

References

External links

1986 births
Czech ice hockey forwards
HC Benátky nad Jizerou players
HC Bílí Tygři Liberec players
HC Nové Zámky players
HK Nitra players
Living people
Sportspeople from Liberec
Czech expatriate ice hockey players in Slovakia